The 4th Lombank Trophy was a motor race, run to Formula One rules, held on 30 March 1963 at Snetterton Motor Racing Circuit, England. The race was run over 50 laps of the circuit, and was won by British driver Graham Hill in a BRM P57. 

The lead changed hands several times between Richie Ginther and Jim Clark, before Hill, who had started from the back of the grid, passed Clark on lap 33. He stayed in front until the end of the race, with Clark second, while Ginther spun and finished fifth. 

This was the first and only Formula One start for Adam Wyllie, who was killed at a Formula Three event at Dunboyne in 1965, when he was involved in an accident with Jack Pearce. Pearce had also entered this Lombank Trophy race but withdrew.

Results

References

 Results at Silhouet.com 
 "The Grand Prix Who's Who", Steve Small, 1995.
 "The Formula One Record Book", John Thompson, 1974, pp 126-127.

Lombank Trophy
Lombank Trophy
Lombank